California Years is the seventh studio album by American singer-songwriter Jill Sobule, released on April 14, 2009, on Sobule's own label, Pinko Records. The album was produced by Don Was and financed completely by fan donations to Sobule's website jillsnextrecord.com.

Track listing
All songs written by Robin Eaton and Jill Sobule except where noted.

 "Palm Springs" – 4:42
 "San Francisco" – 4:50
 "Nothing to Prove" – 3:09
 "Where Is Bobbie Gentry?" – 3:11
 "A Good Life" – 3:05
 "Sweetheart" – 3:01
 "Empty Glass" (Sobule, Elise Thoron) – 3:10
 "League of Failures" – 4:47
 "Wendell Lee" – 4:42
 "Bloody Valentine" – 3:38
 "Mexican Pharmacy" – 2:59
 "While You Were Sleeping" (Bill Demain, Sobule) – 3:06
 "Spiderman" (Bill Demain, Sobule) – 3:20
 "The Donor Song" (Sobule) – 1:45

Three tracks recorded for prospective inclusion on California Years did not make the final cut: "Mom", "The Rapture" and "Gotta Get Me Some" (the latter track, like "Empty Glass", originally written for the musical Prozak and the Platypus).

Personnel
 Dave Carpenter – vocals, piano
 Bill DeMain – guitar
 Robin Eaton  – vocals
 Mark Goldenberg – vocals, guitar, slide guitar, piano
 Bryan Head  – vocals
 Jim Keltner – drums
 Greg Leisz – vocals, dobro, mandolin
 Jamie Muhoberac – organ
 Geoff Pearlman – vocals
 Benmont Tench – organ
 Jill Sobule – vocals, acoustic guitar, banjo, piano

References

Jill Sobule albums
2009 albums
Albums produced by Don Was
Crowdfunded albums